Altha nivea is a moth of the family Limacodidae first described by Francis Walker in 1862. It is found in Sri Lanka, India, Borneo.

The forewings are a white-orange to brown shade. Prominent dark dots are found at one third from the apex on the wing margins.

Larval food plants include Camellia.

References

Moths of Asia
Moths described in 1862
Limacodidae